The Yamaha P-120 is a portable electronic piano, released in 2002.  The 88-key so-called "GH" keyboard is action-weighted, imitating the feel of a real piano. It includes several sample keyboard sounds, such as harpsichord, clavichord, vibraphone, guitar and more.  Basic sequencing and editing are built-in.

Customer service
Problems with keys sticking have been reported, caused by the plastic reacting with the grease used to form an adhesive-like substance. This has been recognised by Yamaha.
Yamaha originally offered to replace the key-bed (part cost only) if sticky keys were experienced. In 2012 this changed to labor cost only. On December 31, 2013, the replacement program ended, and customers paid both parts and labor from that date.

Features
Polyphony: 64
3 x 2-track sequencer
onboard 2x 12.5W speaker
metronome with different accents, from 32 to 280 bpm
14 sounds, 1 variation each, totalling 28
onboard chorus, reverb, delay and phaser effects

See also
Yamaha P-85
Yamaha P-115
Yamaha P-250

References

External links
Yamaha product website

Digital stage pianos
P-120